Petr Cibulka Jr. (born January 9, 1985 in Opava, Czechoslovakia) is a Czech public figure. Cibulka is currently serving as the director of the Czech public policy think tank INFORMAČNÍ INSTITUT, which focuses on research on political issues.

Cibulka has worked as an assistant in the National Economic Council, the advising body to the Czech government. His argument for the Czech National Audit Office to be explicitly able to conduct audits in state owned companies became part of final publication of the group "Fight Against Corruption".

His biggest media impact was when he found out that the Energy Regulatory Office is making decrees without the backing from law. The decree is letting energy distribution companies charge their customers to pay for solar subsidies, although the law does not stipulate such an option.

Cibulka is also a member of the financial committee at Prague 2.

References

External links 
 http://www.petrcibulka.cz/ official website
 http://www.informacniinstitut.cz INFORMAČNÍ INSTITUT website

1985 births
Living people
People from Opava
Czech political scientists